Isochariesthes furva is a species of beetle in the family Cerambycidae. It was described by Fiedler in 1939.

References

furva
Beetles described in 1939